Helen Macdonald (born 1970) is an English writer, naturalist, and an Affiliated Research Scholar at the University of Cambridge Department of History and Philosophy of Science. She is best known as the author of H is for Hawk, which won the 2014 Samuel Johnson Prize and Costa Book Award. In 2016, it also won the Prix du Meilleur Livre Étranger in France.

Early life
Macdonald was born in 1970, the child of Daily Mirror photojournalist Alisdair Macdonald, and grew up in Surrey. Writing about her childhood for The Guardian in 2018, Macdonald said, "I grew up in Camberley, a Victorian town on the A30 in Surrey. It was made of pine forests, golf courses, elderly army officers with parade ground voices, Conservative clubs and tea dances. In 1975 my parents had bought a little white house in Tekels Park, a private estate near the town centre. It was owned by the Theosophical Society. My parents were journalists and knew nothing of theosophy, but they loved the Park, and I did too. No place has so indelibly shaped my writing life".

Macdonald went on to study English at Cambridge University. They were subsequently a Research Fellow at Jesus College, Cambridge from 2004 to 2007, and currently is an Affiliated Research Scholar at the Department of History and Philosophy of Science, University of Cambridge.

Career 
Macdonald has written and narrated several radio programmes, and appeared on television in the BBC Four documentary series, Birds Britannia, in 2010. Their books include Shaler's Fish (2001), Falcon (2006), H is for Hawk (2014), and Vesper Flights (2020). Macdonald received critical acclaim for H is for Hawk, including the 2014 Samuel Johnson Prize for non-fiction and the Costa Book Award. The book—which also became a Sunday Times best-seller—describes the year Macdonald spent after the death of her father training a Northern goshawk named Mabel, and includes biographical material about the naturalist and writer T. H. White.

Macdonald also helped make the film "10 X Murmuration" with filmmaker Sarah Wood as part of a 2015 exhibition at the Brighton Festival. In H is for Hawk: A New Chapter, part of BBC's Natural World series in 2017, she trained a new goshawk chick.

Macdonald presented the BBC Four documentary, The Hidden Wilds of the Motorway, in 2020. That same year saw the publication of their fourth book, Vesper Flights, a collection of essays about "the human relationship to the natural world".

Personal life 
Macdonald resides in Hawkedon, Suffolk. They previously resided with a parrot, Birdoole, who died in 2021. Macdonald's goshawk, Mabel, died in 2014. Macdonald is non-binary and uses She/They pronouns.

Bibliography

Poetry 
Collections

References

External links
 Helen Macdonald - May 2015 ABC interview with Richard Fidler (audio)
 Helen Macdonald's blog

1970 births
Living people
Women naturalists
English naturalists
English nature writers
People from Chelmsford
English women journalists
Fellows of Jesus College, Cambridge
Women science writers
21st-century English women writers
New Statesman people